Thomas Anthony Ryan (2 February 1936 – 3 October 2007) was an Irish billionaire, philanthropist and businessman who co-founded the Ryanair airline.

Through his establishment of Guinness Peat Aviation in 1975 he began a course of events which ultimately led to the development of the international aircraft leasing industry, although he was best known in the public mind as the founder of the eponymous Ryanair with Christopher Ryan and Liam Lonergan. Ryanair was believed to be the main source of his wealth in later life: the company became one of the biggest airlines in Europe and was valued at over 15 billion Euros as of December 2019.

Early life 
Ryan was born at Limerick Junction, County Tipperary on 2 February 1936; his father was a train driver. Around 1945 the family moved to Thurles in the same county, and he attended the Christian Brothers school there. His hopes of attending university were ended by the death of his father, and instead he joined Aer Lingus as a dispatch clerk, and was selected as a management trainee.

Business career
Ryan progressed through station manager roles to become, in 1968, Aer Lingus station manager at JFK Airport, New York. The family returned to Ireland in 1972, where by chance he filled a vacancy in aircraft leasing, finding uses for aircraft that were surplus to the airline's requirements during the cyclical downturn.

In 1975, with financial support from Aer Lingus and the Guinness Peat Group, he founded the aircraft leasing company Guinness Peat Aviation (later GPA Group), raising $5,000 for his 10% shareholding. GPA grew to be the world's biggest aircraft lessor, its activities including wet leasing. The company was worth $4 billion at its peak, but its value dramatically collapsed in 1992 after the cancellation of its planned IPO. Ryan made €55m from the sale of AerFi (the successor to GPA) in 2000.

Ryan was a tax exile who lived in Monte Carlo, but also owned a stud farm near his home in Dolla, County Tipperary. He was the 7th wealthiest individual from Ireland in the Sunday Times Rich List 2007 with over €1.5bn (£1bn).

Ryan over the years helped nurture two successful business protégés – Denis O'Brien and Michael O'Leary – both of whom became billionaires.

Philanthropy
Ryan was an active and innovative funder of university education in Ireland. He donated a marine science institute to NUI Galway in 1993 which was named the Martin Ryan Marine Science Institute in honour of his father. He showed interest in marine science and aquaculture development in the west of Ireland. He also funded The Ryan Academy for Entrepreneurship at the Citywest park, that is run by Dublin City University.

In 2001, Ryan acquired Castleton Farm near Lexington, Kentucky from the Van Lennep Family Trust. Ryan renamed it Castleton Lyons and undertook renovations to the property while returning to its original roots as a thoroughbred operation.

At the time of his death he owned 16% of Tiger Airways, a discount carrier based in Singapore which was founded in December 2003.

Personal life 
Ryan married his childhood sweetheart, Mairéad, in 1958 and they had three sons together. The couple separated while the boys were young but they were not divorced.

Ryan then began a series of affairs with well-connected women, beginning in the mid-1980s with Lady Miranda Guinness, who had earlier separated from her husband Benjamin Guinness, 3rd Earl of Iveagh. Miranda tutored him in matters such as art collecting, fine wines, interior decoration and formal entertaining, and they worked together on redesigning the interior of a Georgian house which Ryan had bought in Pelham Place, South Kensington, London. The relationship ended around 1991 but they remained close friends.

Later relationships included the Irish fashion designer Louise Kennedy, and the interior designer Tiggy Butler, who oversaw the redesigns at two of Ryan's properties: Lyons Demesne (County Kildare) and Castleton Farm (Lexington, Kentucky). His last partner – up to the time of his death – was Martine Head, daughter of French horse trainer and breeder Alec Head; together they shared a passion for horse-racing.

Awards and honours
1994, Order of the Aztec Eagle
2002, Golden Plate Award of the American Academy of Achievement – presented at the International Achievement Summit in Dublin, Ireland
2012, National Aviation Award: the inaugural award was presented to his family by Minister for Transport Leo Varadkar
Ryan held honorary doctorates from several universities, including Trinity College, Dublin, the National University of Ireland, Galway and the University of Limerick.

Death
Ryan, who lived at Lyons Demesne in Ardclough, County Kildare, died on 3 October 2007, aged 71, following an 18-month illness with pancreatic cancer. He had other homes in London, Castleton Lyons stud in Kentucky, Château Lascombes near Bordeaux and on Ibiza. He left more than €20million to his estranged wife Mairéad.

His eldest son, Cathal, died three months later, aged 48, after being diagnosed with cancer.

References

Further reading
 Ryanair: How a Small Irish Airline Conquered Europe by Siobhan Creaton – : published about Ryanair's success and Tony Ryan's earlier enterprises.
Tony Ryan: Ireland's Aviator by Richard Aldous.

External links
 Short Reuters article about his death
 Martin Ryan Marine Science Institute

1936 births
2007 deaths
21st-century Irish businesspeople
Businesspeople in aviation
Ryanair
20th-century Irish businesspeople
Deaths from pancreatic cancer
People from County Kildare
Deaths from cancer in the Republic of Ireland
People from Thurles
20th-century Irish philanthropists
21st-century Irish philanthropists